Indian Hill, in section nine of Oscar Township, Otter Tail County, Minnesota, is a peak in the Leaf Mountains of west-central Minnesota.  It is about 3.5 miles southeast of Rothsay, Minnesota, on the east side of Interstate 94.  On its west side, the hill provides a high vantage point over the upper valley of the Red River of the North, while to the east it provides a view of the adjacent moraines.

References

Hills of Minnesota
Landforms of Otter Tail County, Minnesota